Calonectria quinqueseptata is a fungal plant pathogen.

References

External links

Fungal plant pathogens and diseases
Nectriaceae
Fungi described in 1967